Deep cerebral vein may refer to:

 Deep cerebral veins, a group of veins in the head
 Deep middle cerebral vein, a vein which receives tributaries from the insula and neighboring gyri in the brain